Dan Cragg (born September 6, 1939) is an American science fiction author.

Biography
Cragg was born in Rochester, Newy York. He served in the United States Army from 1958 to 1980, retiring with the rank of Sergeant Major. He served two tours of duty in Vietnam, 1962–63 and 1965-69 as well as tours of duty in Germany, Italy, and South Korea. From 1985 to 2003, worked in the Office of the Secretary of Defense, Washington, DC as a management analyst; member, Fairfax County History Commission, 1997–2003; auxiliary police officer, Fairfax County PD, 1996–2002.

During his tour of duty in the US Army Cragg received, among other awards, the Vietnam Armed Forces Honor Medal and the Vietnam Service Medal, with eleven campaign stars.

Writing career
Cragg writes both military-related fiction and non-fiction.

Non-fiction
The NCO Guide (1982)
A Travel Guide to Military Installations (1983, 2nd edition published as A Guide to Military Installations, 1988)
A Dictionary of Soldier Talk (1984, with John Elting and Ernest Deal)
Inside the VC and NVA: The Real Story of North Vietnam's Armed Forces (1992, with Michael Lee Lanning).
Top Sergeant: The Life and Times of Sergeant Major of the Army William G. Bainbridge (1995, with William G. Bainbridge).
Generals in Muddy Boots: A Concise Encyclopedia of Combat Commanders (1996, with Walter J. Boyne).

As editor
Francis Grose, The Mirror's File: Advice to the Officers of the British Army, with a Biographical Sketch of the Life and a Bibliography of the Works of Captain Francis Grose, F.S.A. (1978, also wrote introduction).
Guardians of the Republic (A History of the non-commissioned officer corps of the U.S. Army) (1992)
Operation Thirty-Four Alpha (history of U.S.-controlled commando operations in North Vietnam, 1992)

Fiction
The Soldier's Prize (novel, 1986)

Science fiction

The StarFist Saga (with David Sherman)
First to Fight (1997)
School of Fire (1998)
Steel Gauntlet (1999)
Blood Contact (1999)
TechnoKill (2000)
Hangfire (2000)
Kingdom's Swords (2002)
Kingdom's Fury (2003)
Lazarus Rising (2003)
A World of Hurt (2004)
Flashfire (2006)
Firestorm (2007)
Wings of Hell (2008)
Double Jeopardy (2009)

The StarFirst: Force Recon Saga (with David Sherman)
Backshot (2005)
PointBlank  2006
Recoil 2008

Novels not part of a series
Jedi Trial (with David Sherman) (2004)

References

External links
Starfist Headquarters (fan site)

Living people
1939 births
20th-century American novelists
American science fiction writers
Military science fiction writers
United States Army soldiers
United States Army personnel of the Vietnam War
University of Maryland, College Park alumni
George Mason University alumni
21st-century American novelists
American male novelists
20th-century American male writers
21st-century American male writers